The 2019 Valparaiso Crusaders football team represents Valparaiso University in the 2019 NCAA Division I FCS football season. They are led by first-year head coach Landon Fox and play their home games at Brown Field. They compete in the Pioneer Football League. It is the school's centennial football season.

Preseason

Preseason coaches' poll
The Pioneer League released their preseason coaches' poll on July 30, 2019. The Crusaders were picked to finish tied for ninth place.

Preseason All–PFL teams
The Crusaders had two players selected to the preseason all–PFL teams.

Defense

First team

Drew Snouffer – LB

Special teams

Second team

Bailey Gessinger – RS

Schedule

Source: Schedule

Game summaries

at Eastern Kentucky

Central Connecticut

at Truman

Charleston (WV)

at Drake

Dayton

at San Diego

Stetson

at Davidson

Morehead State

at Butler

Marist

References

Valparaiso
Valparaiso Beacons football seasons
Valparaiso Crusaders football